Cream of mushroom soup is a simple type of soup where a basic roux is thinned with cream or milk and then mushrooms and/or mushroom broth are added. It is well known in North America as a common type of condensed canned soup. Cream of mushroom soup is often used as a base ingredient in casseroles and comfort foods. This use is similar to that of a mushroom-flavored gravy.

History

Soups made with cream and mushrooms are much older than the canned variety. Ancient Italian (Salsa colla) and French (Béchamel) cream sauces, and soups based on them have been made for many hundreds of years. In America, the Campbell Soup Company began producing its well-known "Cream of Mushroom Soup" in 1934.

Regional usage
Canned cream of mushroom soup has been described as "America's béchamel". In Minnesota, the ingredient is often called "Lutheran binder," in reference to its thickening properties and its prominence in hotdish recipes, especially in Lutheran church cookbooks.

See also

 Bisque (food)
 Clam chowder
 Green bean casserole
 List of mushroom dishes
 List of cream soups
Oyster stew
 List of soups
 Tuna casserole
 Vegetable soup
 List of vegetable soups
 Mushroom sauce

References

External links

(Mushroom) Cream Soup Substitute recipe (using dried bullion)
Cream of Portabella Mushroom Soup

Cream soups
Cuisine of the Midwestern United States
Mushroom dishes